Qaemabad (also Romanized as Qā’emābād) is a village in Posht Rud Rural District, in the Central District of Narmashir County, Kerman Province, Iran. At the 2006 census, its population was 816, in 200 families.

References 

Populated places in Narmashir County